Night Stalker is a top-down maze shooter designed by Steve Montero and released for the Intellivision console in 1982. Night Stalker was ported to the Atari 2600 as Dark Cavern and released under Mattel's M Network label. Apple II and IBM PC versions were published in 1983.

Gameplay 
The player controls a man trapped in a hedgerow maze with no exits and many threats, some natural such as bats and spiders, others artificial  and more deadly in nature such as robots. The player starts out in a bunker in the middle of the map completely defenseless. A gun icon flashes at one of five random locations which he must pick up to arm himself. Each gun has six bullets. Once the ammunition has been exhausted, the gun icon will appear again and the player must move defenselessly through the maze to retrieve the new weapon.

There are five different robots that the man encounters in accordance with the point total. The terrain is filled with corners and ambush points that players must use to full effect. There is also a spider web in the northwest corner where the spider enemy spawns. Player movement is hindered here, and all firepower is heavily suppressed within, making it a strategic location. Also of importance is the player's bunker, in which the player begins each life. The bunker is a safe zone and the player is impervious to damage while inside, though the more advanced robot adversaries have the firepower to destroy this safe haven. 

The game features only one unchanging level and no music, instead having a pulsing background beat playing back at a set interval that signals the speed chosen by the player.

Legacy
The Intellivision version was made available for the PlayStation 3 through PlayStation Home in fall 2012 in a collection titled Intellivision Gen2. In addition to being filled with bats and spiders, it had a greater variety of killer robots along with a variety of maze structures.

An updated version of Night Stalker of the same name has been announced for release on the Intellivision Amico video game console in 2020.

References

External links 
Blue Sky - Night Stalker

1982 video games
Apple II games
Atari 2600 games
Intellivision games
Mattel video games
Maze games
Video games scored by Russell Lieblich
Video games developed in the United States
Single-player video games